Nüyou is a bilingual (English and Chinese) monthly fashion and beauty magazine targeting women. The magazine is based in Singapore.

History and profile
Nüyou was started in 1976. The magazine is part of SPH Magazines and is published on a monthly basis. It covers articles about fashion, beauty tips and celebrities and targets women between the ages of 25 and 30 years-old. The magazine is published in English and Chinese languages.

In April 2013 Terence Lee became the editor-in-chief of Nüyou. He replaced Grace Lee in the aforementioned post.

In 2009 Nüyou was redesigned. The magazine had a Malaysian edition which was belong to Blu Inc Media Sdn Bhd. The company ceased operations since the Malaysian movement control order due to the COVID-19 pandemic which interfered with distribution of the magazine.

References

External links
  

1976 establishments in Singapore
Celebrity magazines
Chinese-language magazines
Magazines established in 1976
Magazines published in Singapore
Monthly magazines published in Singapore
SPH Media Trust
Women's fashion magazines
Women's magazines